The following highways are numbered 709:

Canada
Saskatchewan Highway 709

Costa Rica
 National Route 709

United States